The Yung-Feng High School is a high school in Bade District, Taoyuan City, Taiwan.

The History of Yung-Feng High School

Evolution
A.D. 1995:Ministry of Education planning to establish a "Complete School."
A.D. 1999:"Taoyuan Municipal Yung-Feng High School" was set up. Started to enroll the first Junior High School students and Senior High School students in September.
A.D. 2001:Ministry of Education has stopped the "Complete School" program, the school was ordered to change into "Taoyuan Municipal Yung-Feng High School founded by Taoyuan County."
A.D. 2014:Due to Taoyuan County has been promoted to a special municipal city, the name changed into "Taoyuan Municipal Yung-Feng High School founded by Taoyuan City."

Previous Principals

Transportation
The school is accessible within walking distance east of Neili Station of Taiwan Railways Administration.

See also
 Education in Taiwan

External links
2017 new website (English Version)
Official website(Chinese Version)
Official website(English Version)
Beauty of Yung-Feng High School

1999 establishments in Taiwan
Educational institutions established in 1999
High schools in Taiwan
Schools in Taoyuan